Jean Joho is a French-American chef and restaurateur. He was chef and proprietor of Everest in Chicago (founded in 1986, closed 2020), Paris Club Bistro & Bar and Studio Paris in Chicago, The Eiffel Tower Restaurant in Las Vegas, and Brasserie JO first in Chicago, then in Boston.

Early life and education
Born in Alsace, France, Joho was already working in his aunt's restaurant kitchen, peeling vegetables in full chef uniform and hat, by age six. At age 11, he spent his summer making cheese in Marseilles. His formal training began at age 13 at L'Auberge de L'lll under master chef Paul Haeberlin. Joho honed his craft in other kitchens throughout Europe.

Career
By age 23, Joho was the sous chef at a Michelin three-star restaurant where he commanded a 35-person staff. While studying at the Hotel Restaurant School in Strasbourg, Joho immersed himself in the hotel and restaurant business, as well as the arts of pastry, cheese and wine.

Joho's rise to international success began on the 40th floor of the Chicago Stock Exchange with Everest, which is now one of the world's premier dining rooms and a Relais & Chateaux property. He is a managing partner at Lettuce Entertain You Enterprises and has establishments across the country as well as partnership in several other concepts, including Chicago's Nacional 27 and M Burger.

In 2013, Chef Joho and his team at Everest were awarded four stars by  Chicago Tribune journalist Phil Vettel. He was named Restaurateur of the Year for 2012 by Gayot.

Written works
Jean Joho is the author of The Eiffel Tower Cookbook (Chronicle Books, 2008, 144 pp.). In this cookbook, he shares 50 of his signature dishes.

Personal life
Joho resides in Chicago.

Awards and accolades
Restaurateur of the Year, 2012, Gayot
Michelin star, Everest, 2012
Everest rated 4 stars from Chicago Tribune, Chicago Sun-Times and Chicago Magazine
Everest's wine list has been credited as the "country's best selection of Alsace wine" by USA Today, The New York Times and Saveur

References

External links

Everest

Year of birth missing (living people)
Living people
French chefs
French emigrants to the United States
American chefs
French restaurateurs
American restaurateurs
James Beard Foundation Award winners
Chefs from Chicago
Chefs from Boston